Floyd Pinto (born 16 December 1986) is an Indian football coach. He is currently the assistant coach of Indian Super League club NorthEast United.

He was an IT engineer before taking up football coaching as a career.

Personal life 
Pinto grew up at Mumbai, India. He had his graduation in Information Technology from Don-Bosco Institute, Mumbai University at Kurla-Mumbai.

Career 
During his graduation at Don Bosco, when he was playing for Kenkre FC, the Institute administrator got him into part-time coach of Kenkre FC which at that time was part of Mumbai Elite Division and also for their team at I-League for around 4 years. He then graduated from Asian Football Confederation (AFC) with 'A' License in coaching from the May 2014 batch. He is one of youngest coach in the country holding AFC 'A' license.

In 2017, he joined Luís Norton de Matos as his deputy for the U-17 India National Team and as well as Indian Arrows later. Later on resignation of Matos as the coach of U-20 team and the India arrows in July 2018 he was unanimously appointed as the coach of India national under-20 football team and Indian Arrows Due to poor performance by India U20 team for the AFC qualification, he was released by AIFF as the head coach of the U20 team and the Indian Arrows club team.

NorthEast United 
In August 2022, Pinto moved to Indian Super League club NorthEast United as an assistant to Israeli head coach Marco Balbul.

Statistics

Managerial statistics 
.

References 

Living people
Indian footballers
Footballers from Mumbai
Indian football managers
1986 births
Indian Arrows FC managers
Pailan Arrows managers